Connor McManus (born 29 February 1996) is a Scottish footballer, who plays as a midfielder for East Fife. McManus has previously played for Celtic, Alloa Athletic Queen of the South, Greenock Morton, East Fife (loan) and Stranraer. He recently rejoined East Fife on a 2 year deal in 2021.

Career
McManus joined Celtic's academy in 2005. McManus played for the team in the 2013–14 UEFA Youth League and scored versus A.C. Milan on 26 November 2013 but the club were still eliminated from the competition. In 2015, McManus won the Scottish Youth Cup, captaining the team to a 5–2 win over Old Firm rivals Rangers at Hampden Park.

On 3 July 2015 McManus and teammate Michael Duffy were loaned out to Alloa Athletic. McManus made his senior debut twenty two days later, playing the full 90 minutes in a 1–0 win at Brora Rangers in the first round of the Scottish Challenge Cup and on 8 August 2015 McManus made his league debut in a 3–1 defeat away to Queen of the South at Palmerston Park in Dumfries. McManus scored one goal in a 2-2 draw versus the Doonhamers, as the Wasps were relegated to Scottish League One.

On 24 March 2017, McManus signed on an emergency loan deal at Queen of the South  and returned to Celtic at the end of the 2016-17 season. After he was released by Celtic, McManus signed a six-month contract with Greenock Morton in July 2017.

After Greenock Morton, Connor moved onto East Fife onloan making only 11 appearances and 1 goal then following season signed for Stranraer for two seasons in Scottish League Two.

In August 2021 he moved back permanently with East Fife but hugely missed most of 2021-2022 season with injury where the club was relegated to league two in the end. Therefore made a comeback in the 1-0 away win over Albion Rovers on 11th February 2023.

References

External links
 
 

1996 births
Living people
Scottish footballers
Association football midfielders
Celtic F.C. players
Alloa Athletic F.C. players
Scottish Professional Football League players
Queen of the South F.C. players
Greenock Morton F.C. players
Stranraer F.C. players
East Fife F.C. players